Pseudorhaphitoma mamillata is a small sea snail, a marine gastropod mollusk in the family Mangeliidae.

Description
The length of the shell attains 5.3 mm, its diameter 2 mm.

The pinkish shell has a subovate shape. It contains 5 whorls. This shell is very remarkable on account of the large size of its two, convex, papillose protoconch whorls. The others are convex and show 7-8, almost straight and strong ribs extending to the base of the body whorl. These are crossed overall by slight spiral striations, (eight in the body whorl). The aperture is oblong and measures almost one-half of the total length of the shell. The outer lip is strongly incrassate and slightly sinuate. The columella has a slight callus. The siphonal canal is short and narrow.

Distribution
Unknown type locality in the tropical Indo-West Pacific.

References

 R.N. Kilburn, Turridae (Mollusca: Gastropoda) of southern Africa and Mozambique. Part 7. Subfamily Mangeliinae, section 2; Annals of the Natal Museum 34, pp 317 - 367 (1993)

External links
 
 

mamillata
Gastropods described in 1888